GMA Music (formerly known as Infiniti Music and GMA Records) is a subsidiary of GMA Network Inc. and is engaged in the production, marketing and distribution of music and concerts. GMA Music is a member of PARI and has the distinction of having two Diamond Record awards in the highly competitive music scene.

Current local artists
Male
Alden Richards
Anthony Rosaldo
Derrick Monasterio
Garrett Bolden
Jeremiah Tiangco
Jeric Gonzales
Ken Chan
Kristofer Martin
Migo Adecer
Nar Cabico
Psalms David
Ruru Madrid
Vilmark Viray

Female
Angel Guardian
Arra San Agustin 
Barbie Forteza
Bianca Umali
Golden Cañedo
Hannah Precillas
Jessica Villarubin
Jillian Ward
Kyline Alcantara
Kyryll Ugdiman
Maricris Garcia
Mariane Osabel
Mikee Misalucha
Mikee Quintos
Mirriam Manalo
Princess Velasco 
Roxanne Miranda 
Sanya Lopez
XOXO
Lyra Micolob
Riel Lomadilla
Mel Caluag
Dani Ozaraga
Ysabel Ortega
Zephanie Dimaranan

Former artists
 3LOGY (2015–2016)
 Aicelle Santos (2005–2014)
 Anne Raz (2018–2019)
 Bryan Chong (2019–2021)
 Gerald Santos (2006–2011)
 Dingdong Avanzado (1996–1999)
 Frencheska Farr (2009–2016)
 Gary Granada
 Geoff Taylor (2009–2011)
 James Wright (2013–2016)
 Janno Gibbs (2004–2018)
 Jaya (2007–2011)
 Jessa Zaragoza (2012–2014)
 Jolina Magdangal (2004–2009)
 Jona (2005–2013)
 Jong Madaliday (2019–2021)
 Julie Anne San Jose (2012–2017, 2020)
 Kitchie Nadal (2007–2008)
 Kris Lawrence (2012–2014)
 One Up (2016–2020)
 Sunshine Cruz (1999)
 The Tux
 Yasmien Kurdi (2005–2008)

Compilations of GMA Music
 All About Love (2009)
 Isang Kinabukasan: A Kapuso Benefit Album (collaboration with GMA Kapuso Foundation) (2007)
 Tunog Kapuso: The Best of GMA TV Themes Vol. 1 (2005)
 Metropop Song Festival compilation album (1996–2002)
 Mga Awit Kapuso Vol. 5 (2008)
 Mga Awit Mula Sa Puso: The Best of GMA TV Themes Vol. 2 (2006)
 Mga Awit ng Kapuso: The Best of GMA TV Themes Vol. 3 (2007)
 Mga Awiting Kapuso: Best of GMA TV Soundtracks Vol. 4 (2008)
 Mga Awit Mula Sa Puso: The Best of GMA TV Themes Vol. 6 (2013)
 Mga Awit Kapuso Volume 7 (2016)
 Kapuso Sa Pasko: The GMA Records All Star Christmas Album (2005)
 Pinoy Pop Superstar Grand Contender Vol. 1 (2005)
 Pinoy Pop Superstar Grand Contender Vol. 2 (2006)
 Pinoy Pop Superstar Grand Contender Vol. 3 (2007)
 Seasons of Love: The Best of Mga Awit Kapuso Vol. 7 (2014)
 The Best Of Mga Awit Kapuso (2009)
 Awit Kapuso: Kay Sarap Maging Kapuso (2011)
 Take1: The Best Of Awit Kapuso Originals (2013)

Movie soundtracks on GMA Music
 Mulawin The Movie Soundtrack (2005)
 Lovestruck (2008) 
 Moments Of Love (2006)
 Pers Lab: The Music of First Time (2010)
 Tween Academy: Class of 2012 (Official Movie Soundtrack) (2011)

GMA Records Home Video

Movies and TV movies
Some movies are released with GMA Films partners (most being Regal Entertainment or Viva Films) but the following are solely released by GMA Records Home Video:

TV series

Discography

Gallery

Sub-labels 

 AltG Records
 GMA Playlist

References

External links
 

 
Philippine record labels
Pop record labels
Record labels established in 1995
Record labels established in 2003
Record labels established in 2019
Companies based in Quezon City
Entertainment companies of the Philippines
Philippine companies established in 1995
Philippine companies established in 2003
Philippine companies established in 2019